Stephen John Devine (born 12 December 1976) is a New Zealand rugby union footballer. He is a former All Black and international sevens player for Australia.

Devine played for Australia Under-21 before relocating to New Zealand. A loyal servant of Auckland rugby, he made 78 appearances for Auckland and 70 for the Blues in the Super 12 Rugby competition. He was eligible to play for the New Zealand on residential grounds, and made his debut for the All Blacks on 9 November 2002, against England during the All Blacks end of year tour. Devine went on to play 10 tests for New Zealand, including the third/fourth place playoff in the 2003 Rugby World Cup.

He had to retire from rugby in 2007 after a series of concussions and other injuries, and a very long recovery period to recover from his final on-field concussion (2 years). After retirement, Devine co-hosted a programme on New Zealand Sky TV called This Given Sunday, along with Karl Te Nana.

He is now a firefighter. In 2019, he revealed that he still suffers from migraines, extreme fatigue and light sensitivity due to the left pupil not being able to dilate properly.

References

External links
 

Australian rugby union players
New Zealand rugby union players
New Zealand international rugby union players
Australian people of New Zealand descent
Auckland rugby union players
Blues (Super Rugby) players
Rugby union scrum-halves
1976 births
Living people
Rugby union players from New South Wales